GRB2-related adapter protein is a protein that in humans is encoded by the GRAP gene.

This gene encodes a member of the GRB2/Sem5 (C. elegans homolog)/Drk (Drosophila homolog) family. This member functions as a cytoplasmic signaling protein which contains an SH2 domain flanked by two SH3 domains. The SH2 domain interacts with ligand-activated receptors for stem cell factor and erythropoietin, and facilitates the formation of a stable complex with the BCR-ABL oncoprotein. This protein also associates with the Ras guanine nucleotide exchange factor SOS1 (son of sevenless homolog 1) through its N-terminal SH3 domain.

Interactions 

GRAP has been shown to interact with Linker of activated T cells.

References

Further reading